Muhammad Aslam Khan Khattak (5 April 1908 – 10 October  2008) was a Pakistani politician and diplomat who was the Governor of North-West Frontier Province (present-day  Khyber Pakhtunkhwa province from 1973 to 1974).

Early life and education 
Aslam Khattak used to play tennis, do some swimming and mountaineering in his younger years.
Khattak studied history at Brasenose College, Oxford, from 1929 to 1932.

Career
Born into a Pashtun Khattak family on 5 April, 1908 at Karak, British India. Aslam Khattak was the President of a student organization supporting Pakistan Movement in the U.K. in the 1930s, serving alongside Dr. Abdur Rahim as Vice President and Chaudhry Rehmat Ali as Secretary. This organization gave the world the name "PAKISTAN". Aslam Khattak was among the three people that signed the pamphlet called 'Now or Never', written by Chaudhry Rehmat Ali in 1933. 

Aslam Khattak worked closely with Dr Khan Sahib in the Khyber-Pakhtunkhwa's provincial government during his career as a civil servant, and after the independence of Pakistan in 1947, he was assigned a position in Afghanistan where he played a key role in the failed negotiations for a confederation between Pakistan and Afghanistan. In the 1970 elections, he was elected as an independent to the Provincial Assembly of Khyber Pakhtunkhwa from Karak. He then became speaker of the Khyber-Pakhtunkhwa Assembly in 1972. He also served as Governor of Khyber Pakhtunkhwa briefly after the ouster of the NAP-JUI governor as well, twice posted overseas as an Ambassador of Pakistan.

He was promoted as Minister of Pakistan to Kabul in 1956 and appointed as Ambassador to Australia in December 1959. As a diplomat, he served as ambassador to Iran (1974–1977), Iraq and Afghanistan.

Nominated to Muhammad Zia-ul-Haq's Majlis-e-Shura in the 1980s, he became a trusted political confidante of the Martial Law ruler.

He was elected MNA from his constituency and served as deputy Prime Minister to Prime Minister Muhammad Khan Junejo in 1985. After the restoration of democracy in Pakistan in 1988, he joined the Pakistan Muslim League (N), but was defeated in the Pakistani general election, 1988. Re-elected again in 1990, he again served as Federal Minister in Nawaz Sharif’s first government. Defeated in the 1993 elections, he left the PML (N) shortly before the 1997 election over a difference in the distribution of party tickets for his grandson and son-in-law.

Death
He died, after a protracted illness, at the Pakistan Institute of Medical Sciences (PIMS) hospital, Islamabad on 10 October 2008 at age 100. He also had a history of heart disease.

Awards and recognition
Sitara-e-Pakistan (Star of Pakistan) Award by the Government of Pakistan in 1958.

See also 
Yusuf Khattak

Bibliography 
Aslam Khattak spoke, read and wrote Pashtu, Urdu, Punjabi, Persian, Arabic, French and English. He stated that he did a journalism course from Brussels, and introduced freestyle essays in Pashtu literature in his booklet "Gul Masti". He also said he wrote a Pashtu play, "Da Veno Jam". This was highly commended in the literary supplement of `The Times' (London), when it was later translated into English.
'A Pathan Odyssey', an autobiography by Muhammad Aslam Khattak

References

External links
khyber.org
Aslam Khattak A man for all seasons
 A story of a Khattak
Muhammad Aslam Khan Khattak's obituary

1908 births
2008 deaths
Governors of Khyber Pakhtunkhwa
Interior ministers of Pakistan
Pakistani centenarians
Men centenarians
Pashtun people
Ambassadors of Pakistan to Afghanistan
Ambassadors of Pakistan to Iran
Ambassadors of Pakistan to Iraq
High Commissioners of Pakistan to Australia
Pakistan Movement activists
Speakers of the Provincial Assembly of Khyber Pakhtunkhwa
Pakistani MNAs 1985–1988
Pakistani civil servants
Pakistani MNAs 1990–1993
Federal ministers of Pakistan
Aslam
Recipients of the Sitara-e-Pakistan
Alumni of Brasenose College, Oxford